Jocelyn Benson (born October 22, 1977) is an American activist, politician, and former academic administrator. She is the 43rd Secretary of State of Michigan. Benson is a former dean of Wayne State University Law School, a co-founder of the Military Spouses of Michigan, and a board member of the Ross Initiative in Sports for Equality. She is the author of State Secretaries of State: Guardians of the Democratic Process (2010).

In 2018, Benson was elected Secretary of State by an 8.9 percentage point margin, defeating Republican Mary Treder Lang and becoming the first Democrat to hold the office since Richard H. Austin left office in 1995. She was reelected in 2022, defeating Republican Kristina Karamo by 14 percentage points, the largest margin and vote share of any statewide candidate that year.

Education and career
Benson graduated magna cum laude from Wellesley College in 1999, where she founded the now-annual Women in American Political Activism conference and was the first student to be elected to serve in the governing body for the town of Wellesley, Massachusetts. She subsequently earned her master's in sociology as a Marshall Scholar at Magdalen College, Oxford, conducting research into the sociological implications of white supremacy and neo-Nazism.

Prior to attending law school, Benson also lived in Montgomery, Alabama, where she worked for the Southern Poverty Law Center as an investigative journalist, researching white supremacist and neo-Nazi organizations. Benson has also worked as a summer associate for voting rights and election law for the NAACP Legal Defense and Educational Fund, and as a legal assistant to Nina Totenberg at National Public Radio.

Benson received her JD from Harvard Law School, where she was a general editor of the Harvard Civil Rights-Civil Liberties Law Review. From 2002–2004, she served as the Voting Rights Policy Coordinator of the Harvard Civil Rights Project, a non-profit organization that sought to link academic research to civil rights advocacy efforts, where she worked on the passage of the federal Help America Vote Act.

Upon graduation from Harvard Law, Benson moved to Detroit to serve as a law clerk to the Honorable Damon J. Keith on the U.S. Court of Appeals for the Sixth Circuit.

Wayne Law
Benson was appointed dean of Wayne State Law School in December 2012 at the age of 35, becoming the youngest woman to lead a top 100 law school in United States history.

As dean she established two "marquee" programs: the Levin Center at Wayne Law, chaired by former United States Senator Carl Levin (D-MI), and the Program on Entrepreneurship and Business Law, which helps aspiring business professionals in underserved communities participate in the economic revival of Detroit.

Prior to being appointed Dean in 2012, Benson was the Associate Director of the Damon J. Keith Center for Civil Rights, where she started the Michigan Allies Project, an effort designed to track hate incidents throughout Michigan and provide legal support for victims.

The Ross Initiative in Sports for Equality
From 2016–2018 Benson served as CEO of the Ross Initiative in Sports for Equality (RISE), where she led a coalition of all major sports leagues to empower athletes to advance equality.

Military Spouses of Michigan
In 2012, Benson joined with three military spouses and family members in Michigan to create Military Spouses of Michigan, a network dedicated to providing support and services to military family members and veterans in Michigan. In January 2013, the group was selected to represent the state of Michigan in the Presidential Inaugural Parade, the only group of military spouses to receive that honor.

Civics education and election law
In 2011, Benson was selected to serve with retired U.S. Supreme Court Justice Sandra Day O'Connor on the national board of directors of iCivics, Inc., a nonprofit created by Justice O'Connor to improve civics education throughout the country. In addition to serving as an appointed member of the American Bar Association's Standing Committee on Election Law, she is also the founder and current director of the Michigan Center for Election Law, which hosts projects that support transparency and integrity in elections. In 2011, the center hosted Michigan's first "Citizens' Redistricting Competition", providing an opportunity for Michigan citizens to access software and draw their own redistricting maps for the state.

Benson developed and supervised three statewide nonpartisan election protection efforts in Michigan in 2007, 2008 and 2012.  During the 2008 election, she was called to testify before the U.S. House Judiciary Committee, where she called on Secretary Terri Lynn Land to ban the use of foreclosure lists to challenge voters' eligibility on Election Day. She is a frequent commentator on voting rights and election law on local news and radio broadcasts.

In 2007, Benson worked with several groups to successfully keep a Secretary of State branch office open in Buena Vista Township, Michigan. The U.S. Department of Justice, under then-President George W. Bush, concluded that the closure of the office would violate the Voting Rights Act.

Secretary of State
 
In March 2010, Benson published her first book, State Secretaries of State: Guardians of the Democratic Process. The book highlights best practices of secretaries of state from throughout the country and seeks to inform voters about how secretaries of state from either side of the political spectrum can work to advance democracy and election reform.  After working with secretaries of state from around the country while researching the book, she was inspired to run for the office in her resident state of Michigan.

On October 27, 2017, Benson announced her candidacy for Michigan Secretary of State. She was elected on November 6, 2018, defeating Republican Mary Treder Lang, becoming the first Democrat to serve since Richard Austin left office in 1995.

During Benson's administration, some controversies occurred over the Michigan Bureau of Elections' guidance to clerks regarding signature matching on absentee ballots in advance of the 2020 presidential election, which stated – as in previous elections – that signature review should begin with the presumption that the signature is the voter's valid signature, and should be rejected if it differs in clear and obvious respects to the signature on file. (Michigan law requires clerks to match required signatures on absentee ballot applications and absentee ballot envelopes with the voter signature on file to ensure the person submitting the ballot is the same one registered to vote in Michigan.)

In March 2021, State Court of Claims Judge Christopher M. Murray ruled that in order to be binding on clerks, the Bureau of Elections should issue signature-matching instructions as an administrative rule (which the Bureau is now in the process of doing). Judge Murray stated "the mandatory presumption goes well beyond the realm of mere advice and direction." The court found the content of Benson's instructions violated election law, and clerks should not refer to it.

Personal life
A long-distance runner, Benson averages two full marathons per year. She has completed twenty-three full marathons since 2005, including races in New York City, Honolulu, San Francisco, Washington DC, Florence, Venice, Chicago and Philadelphia. She completed her 18th marathon representing Team Red White and Blue in Rome, Italy. In 2016 she completed her second Boston Marathon and became one of a handful of women in history to complete the Boston Marathon while more than eight months pregnant. She is married to Ryan Friedrichs, Chief Development Officer for the City of Detroit, and has one son.

Awards
Crain's Detroit Business named her one of Michigan's "Most Influential Women" in 2016 and in October 2015, she became one of the youngest women in the state's history to be inducted into the Michigan Women's Hall of Fame, second only to Serena Williams. In 2022, Benson was named as one of five recipients of the John F. Kennedy Profile in Courage Award for her efforts to protect democracy. On January 6, 2023, Benson was awarded the Presidential Citizens Medal by President Joe Biden, for her "undaunted and unflinching" work in performing "exemplary public service to advance free and fair elections."

Electoral history

References

External links

 Government website
 Campaign website

1977 births
Living people
21st-century American politicians
21st-century American women politicians
Alumni of Magdalen College, Oxford
American legal scholars
Harvard Law School alumni
Lawyers from Detroit
Marshall Scholars
Michigan Democrats
Secretaries of State of Michigan
Wayne State University faculty
Wellesley College alumni
Women state constitutional officers of Michigan
Women in Michigan politics
American women legal scholars
American women academics
Presidential Citizens Medal recipients